Susan Butler may refer to: 

Susan Dart Butler (1888–1959), American librarian
Susan Butler (American writer) (born 1932)
Susan M. Butler (born 1948), Australian lexicographer
Susan Bulkeley Butler, American businesswoman